No More Dying Then is a novel by the British crime-writer Ruth Rendell. It was first published in 1971, and is the sixth title in her popular Inspector Wexford series. The Independent Mystery Booksellers Association listed the book as one of its 100 Favourite Crime Novels of the Century.

1971 British novels
Novels by Ruth Rendell
Hutchinson (publisher) books
Inspector Wexford series